Chiquet Mawet (born Michelle Beaujean; 23 January 1937 – 4 July 2000) was a playwright, storyteller, poet, social activist and professor of ethics. Part of the generation between Stalingrad 1942 and May 1968, Beaujean, at 20, was fascinated by the hope of self-managed socialism (Titoism) in Yugoslavia. At 30, she became a pioneer of the anti-nuclear movement in Belgium. At 50, she flirted with anarchists.

Writing

A playwright, in addition to her texts and articles, Mawet was the author of numerous plays including La Pomme des hommes, Le prince-serpent, Le Pape et la putain, Caïus et Umbrella, and Nuinottenakt.

 1990: Piratons Perrault. Funny and incisive recovery of the illustrious Contes de ma mère l'Oye by Charles Perrault. The ogre, Bluebeard, Cinderella, Snow White, Le Petit Poucet, Le Chat botté… all of these characters have lived in everyone's memory. Chiquet Mawet made a point of redistributing the roles conceived three centuries earlier by the famous French writer during the atomic era. And, updated in this way, these characters can reveal unimaginable and scandalous secrets.
 1994: The Pope and the Whore. Argument: God sends Pope Julius, assisted by his secretary Francis, to a new Mary, better suited to our valley of tears. Maria, a Moscow mother who occasionally works as a prostitute, is the victim of this modern annunciation which will take place at a time when all the social and political orientations which are currently being put in place in the world will converge towards final chaos. There is a first version of this text entitled Maria or The Pope and the Whore.

In 1989, she was a founding member of the association Silence, les Dunes! which brought together around ten artists from the Verviers region.

Activism
On 19 June 1975, during a press conference in Brussels announcing the creation of a Common Anti-Nuclear Front (FAAN), Michèle Beaujean represented the APRI (Association for the Protection against Ionizing Radiation) 11.

On 12 March 1976, in Namur, during the constitutive general assembly of Friends of the Earth (Belgian section), she was elected member of the board of directors of the new association12.

A radical activist in the anti-nuclear movement, she coordinated the departures from Belgium for the demonstration of 31 July 1977 against Superphénix in Creys-Malville: A protester dies following violent clashes with the police.

It then distances itself from the political ecology which it perceives as a political recuperation of the "executives" of the anti-nuclear social movement.

At the end of the 1990s, she contributed to the creation of the Collectif Chômeur, Pas Chien! in the Liège Region 13.

Collectif Chômeur, Pas Chien! [The Unemployed, Not Dog, Collective!]

During an Unemployed, Pas Chien! Action.
Birth of a revolt, affirmation of resistance. I am unemployed / I did not look for it / and no one has the right / to treat me / like a dog. / I have my dignity / to be human / and the right to live / and provide / my family decently. / I want to lead freely / my social, / cultural, / and loving / life like the others, / without being tracked by / relentless inspectors. / I refuse fatality. / That must change. This is the text of the appeal launched by Chômeur, pas chien!

Composed of unemployed people and various associations, the Collective proposes "to implement concrete actions to denounce discriminatory practices" that the new regulations (of the 1990s) install against the unemployed. For the Collective, deprived of employment, the individual is driven out of the democratic space and is confined to the status of sub-citizen14,15.

The demands of Collectif Chômeur, Pas Chien! are not pre-established according to a political program, they emerge from the experience of unemployed citizens and from a collective reflection that the association wishes to extend to the entire social body, workers and unemployed alike. Collectif Chômeur, Pas Chien! refuses material and moral penalization, linked to the criterion of employment. Every person, worker or not, has the right to a means of existence consistent with human dignity. For the Collective, wealth is no longer the fruit of human labor as much as that of modern technologies, automation and the financial games they allow, thus leading a growing number of people to no longer have a place in the system. production or even in services.

In 1998, Mawet gave a good account of the anti-political spirit of this period: “Except ideological autism, we can understand the motivations of those who strive to constitute a force of political opposition (…) However, it is difficult not to note that 'from the moment when individuals come together in an organization aiming for power – even a very small piece – they cease to be in phase with those they claim to represent and inevitably end up instrumentalizing them: in their head, voters, grassroots activists, union members are quickly reduced to fuel for their race.”16.

In 1999, a documentary film was created about the experience of the Collectif17.

Woman of commitments
Libertarian Alternative: in the 1990s, columnist and polemicist, she regularly collaborated with the monthly Alternative Libertaire. She published dozens of texts there18.
In 1997, she recalls her atypical career in the collective work Le Hasard et la necessity: how I became a libertarian19.
Disappearance

After a long illness, Mawet committed suicide  on 4 July 2000, at the age of 62.

Works

Stage plays 

 La véritable histoire de Juliette et Roméo (1988)
 Piratons Perrault! ou L'horrible fin du sapiens: sortie sur le parvis du xxie siècle (1990)
  Caius et Umbrella (1990)
  La pomme des hommes (1991)
 La reine des gorilles (1991)
 Le Pape et la Putain (1993)
 Le Prince-Serpent (1994)
 Nuinottenakt (1995)

Contributions to collective works 

  Neptune et Jéhovah étaient sur un bateau (1987)
 Joutes internationales (1991)
 Profession de foi (1996)
 Dossier drogues (1996)
  Le Hasard et la nécessité : comment je suis devenu libertaire (1997)
  La Soupière : comme un cheveu sur ou dans la soupe (c'est selon) (1998)
 Solo (1998)
 Nature morte, morte nature (1999)

Publications 

  Chiquet Mawet, Médiathèque des territoires de la mémoire
  Réflexions sur le théâtre : lettre à l'acteur inconnu, Alternative libertaire
  Chômeur, pas chien ! Résister, s'organiser !, Alternative libertaire
  Nature humaine : à gauche toute ! Sur la nature de l'homme qui serait d'obéir, Médiathèque des territoires de la mémoire
  Correspondance, Center for Literary and Theatrical Research and Documentation of the Wallonia-Brussels Federation

Bibliography
University work
Nancy Delhalle44, The repertoire of contemporary dramatic authors: Belgian theater in the French language, Alternatives théâtrales no 55 (co-edition, Society of dramatic authors and composers (SACD), Promotion of letters, Archives and museum of literature, French Community of Belgium), 1997, p. 139–140, 21845.
Nancy Delhalle, Authors in the ruins. Parcours arbitraire, Alternatives théâtrales no 56, Brussels, 1997, p. 36–39.

See also 

 Performance artworks by Chiquet Mawet at Archives and Literature Museum (Belgium)

References

1937 births
2000 deaths
People from Verviers
20th-century Belgian poets
2000 suicides
Belgian women poets
20th-century Belgian women writers
Suicides in Belgium